Avelino da Silva Martins (born 11 May 1905, date of death unknown) was a Portuguese footballer who played as central defender.

Football career 

Martins gained 8 caps for Portugal and made his debut 8 June 1930 in Antwerp against Belgium, in a 1–2 defeat.

External links 

1905 births
Portuguese footballers
Association football defenders
Primeira Liga players
FC Porto players
Portugal international footballers
Year of death missing
Place of birth missing